Kenmore Farm  is a historic farm and educational property at 369 Kenmore Road, just outside Amherst, Virginia.  The centerpiece of the more than  property is a c. 1856 brick Greek Revival farmhouse, built by Samuel Garland, Sr., a prominent local lawyer and politician.  The  property was used intermittently between 1872 and 1899 as a preparatory high school, operated by Henry Aubrey Strode, who later became the first president of Clemson University.  As such, its building complex includes a dormitory and apartment building in addition to a variety of mainly agricultural outbuildings, among which are a corn crib and barn, and the remnants of an outdoor summer kitchen.  The property has seen predominantly agricultural use in the 20th century.

The property was added to the National Register of Historic Places in 2015.

See also
National Register of Historic Places listings in Amherst County, Virginia

References

Houses in Amherst County, Virginia
Houses completed in 1856
Greek Revival houses in Virginia
Houses on the National Register of Historic Places in Virginia
Farms on the National Register of Historic Places in Virginia
National Register of Historic Places in Amherst County, Virginia